"Grotto of the Dancing Deer" is a science fiction short story by American writer Clifford D. Simak, one of his last short works. It won the 1980 Nebula Award for Best Short Story and the 1981 Hugo Award for Best Short Story and Locus Award for Best Short Story. The story involves an archaeologist discovering a comical, ancient cave-painting and then meeting with its original painter, an immortal still living nearby.

References

External links 

1980 short stories
Short stories by Clifford D. Simak
Hugo Award for Best Short Story winning works
Works originally published in Analog Science Fiction and Fact
Nebula Award for Best Short Story-winning works
1980s science fiction works